Magkasangga 2000 (International title: Ultracop 2000) is a 1995 Philippine-Hong Kong action sci-fi film directed by Phillip Ko, Joe Mari Avellana and Johnny Wood. The film stars Ricky Davao, Cynthia Luster and Monsour del Rosario.

The film is streaming online on YouTube.

Plot
Set in the year 2000, interplanetary outlaw Zorback ignores the Universal Treaty by traveling to Earth to wreak havoc. The Ultracops, led by Superintendent Nuñez, are the only ones who can stop him.

Cast
 Ricky Davao as Tony Braganza
 Cynthia Luster as Trishia Marks
 Monsour del Rosario as Jared
 Eddie Gutierrez as Superintendent Nuñez
 Gabriel Romulo as Zorbak
 Charlie Davao as Tecson
 Phillip Ko as Benny Gabaldon
 Melvin Wong as Drago
 Bernardo Bernardo as Ador
 Jaime Fabregas as Prof. Duval
 Elenor Academea as Elenor
 Rando Almanzor as Russel McBean
 Larissa Ledesma as Gina Braganza
 Jimmy Ko as Jimmy
 James Hermogenes as Allan Corpuz
 Bhong Villegas as Ronnie

References

External links

Full Movie on Solar Pictures

1995 films
Filipino-language films
1990s English-language films
1990s Cantonese-language films
Hong Kong science fiction action films
Philippine science fiction action films
Philippine multilingual films
Hong Kong multilingual films
1995 action films
1995 science fiction films
Harvest International Films films
1995 multilingual films
1990s science fiction action films
1990s Hong Kong films